Ole Imerslun Reistad (26 June 1898 – 22 December 1949) was a Norwegian military officer and accomplished sports person. He competed at the 1920 Summer Olympics in modern pentathlon, and also became Norwegian champion in the sport. He competed in military patrol at the 1928 Winter Olympics, winning the competition. During World War II he was leader of the training camp Little Norway in Canada.

Personal life
Reistad was born in Aker; the son of Christen Reistad and Gudborg Imerslun. He was married to Bergljot Huseby from 1927. He died in Oslo in 1949, only 51 years old.

Sports career
In the pentathlon he finished fourteenth at the 1920 Summer Olympics and became Norwegian champion in 1922. He also participated in the 1928 Olympic Winter Games in St. Moritz, Switzerland, in the demonstration event military patrol. He was also the Norwegian flag bearer at the opening ceremony. In 1922, he was awarded the prestigious Norwegian sports award - the Egebergs Ærespris - for achievements in multiple sports.

Military career
During the campaign following Nazi Germany's assault on Norway on 9 April 1940, Reistad was an air unit commander and led the operations from Bardufoss Air Station against the German forces.

Shortly before his death, he was appointed a Commander with Star of the Order of St. Olav.

Literature 
 Ole Reistad, "The Spirit of Little Norway" (Biography), Edvard Omholt-Jensen.

References

1898 births
1949 deaths
Athletes (track and field) at the 1920 Summer Olympics
Military patrol competitors at the 1928 Winter Olympics
Norwegian pentathletes
Norwegian Army Air Service personnel of World War II
Norwegian Army personnel
Norwegian military patrol (sport) runners
Olympic athletes of Norway
Olympic biathletes of Norway
Norwegian male athletes